In information theory and signal processing, the Discrete Universal Denoiser (DUDE) is a denoising scheme for recovering sequences over a finite alphabet, which have been corrupted by a discrete
memoryless channel. The DUDE was proposed in 2005 by Tsachy Weissman, Erik Ordentlich, Gadiel Seroussi, Sergio Verdú and Marcelo J. Weinberger.

Overview
The Discrete Universal Denoiser (DUDE) is a denoising scheme that estimates an
unknown signal  over a finite
alphabet from a noisy version .
While most denoising schemes in the signal processing
and statistics literature deal with signals over
an infinite alphabet (notably, real-valued signals), the DUDE addresses the
finite alphabet case. The noisy version  is assumed to be generated by transmitting
 through a known discrete
memoryless channel.

The idea underlying the DUDE is best illustrated when  is a
realization of a random vector . If the conditional distribution
, namely
the distribution of the noiseless symbol  conditional on its noisy context  was available, the optimal
estimator  would be the Bayes Response to
.
Fortunately, when
the channel matrix is known and non-degenerate, this conditional distribution
can be expressed in terms of the conditional distribution
, namely
the distribution of the noisy symbol  conditional on its noisy
context. This conditional distribution, in turn, can be estimated from an
individual observed noisy signal  by virtue of the Law of Large Numbers,  
provided  is “large enough”.

Applying the DUDE scheme with a context length  to a sequence of
length  over a finite alphabet  requires
 operations and space .

Under certain assumptions, the DUDE is a universal scheme in the sense of asymptotically performing as well as an optimal denoiser, which has oracle access to the unknown sequence. More specifically, assume that the denoising performance is measured using a given single-character fidelity criterion, and consider the regime where the sequence length  tends to infinity and the context length  tends to infinity “not too fast”. In the stochastic setting, where a doubly infinite sequence noiseless sequence  is a realization of a stationary process , the DUDE asymptotically performs, in expectation, as well as the best denoiser, which has oracle access to the source distribution .

The discrete denoising problem

Let  be the finite alphabet of a fixed but unknown original “noiseless” sequence . The sequence is fed into a discrete
memoryless channel (DMC). The DMC operates on each symbol  independently, producing a corresponding random symbol  in a finite alphabet . The DMC produces a random noisy sequence .
A denoiser is a function  that attempts to recover the noiseless sequence  from a distorted version .
The problem of choosing the denoiser  is known as signal
estimation, filtering or smoothing.

 

The DUDE scheme

Step 1: Calculating the empirical distribution in each context
The DUDE corrects symbols according to their context. The context length  used is a tuning parameter of the scheme. A two-sided context is a combination  of a left and a right context.

The first step of the DUDE scheme is to calculate the empirical distribution of symbols in each possible two-sided context along the noisy sequence .

 

Thus, the first step of the DUDE scheme with context length  is to scan the input noisy sequence  once, and store the length- empirical distribution vector  (or its non-normalized version, the count vector) for each two-sided context found along . Since there are at most  possible two-sided contexts along , this step requires  operations and storage .

Step 2: Calculating the Bayes response to each context
We define the Bayes Response to any vector  of length  with non-negative entries as

 

This definition is motivated in the background below.

The second step of the DUDE scheme is to calculate, for each two-sided context  observed in the previous step along , and for each symbol  observed in each context (namely, any  such that  is a substring of ) the Bayes response to the vector , namely

 

Note that the sequence  and the context length  are implicit.

This formula assumed that the channel matrix  is square and invertible.

 

By caching the inverse or pseudo-inverse , and the values  for the relevant pairs , this step requires  operations and  storage.

Step 3: Estimating each symbol by the Bayes response to its context
The third and final step of the DUDE scheme is to scan  again and compute the actual denoised sequence . The denoised symbol chosen to replace  is the Bayes response to the two-sided context of the symbol, namely

 

This step requires  operations and used the data structure constructed in the previous step.

In summary, the entire DUDE requires  operations and  storage.

Asymptotic optimality properties
The DUDE is designed to be universally optimal, namely optimal (is some sense, under some assumptions) regardless of the original sequence .

Let  denote a sequence of DUDE schemes, as described above, where  uses a context length  that is implicit in the notation. We only require that  and that .

For a stationary source
Denote by  the set of all -block denoisers, namely all maps .

Let  be an unknown stationary source and  be the distribution of the corresponding noisy sequence. Then

 

and both limits exist. If, in addition the source  is ergodic, then

For an individual sequence
Denote by  the set of all -block -th order sliding window denoisers, namely all maps  of the form  with  arbitrary.

Let  be an unknown noiseless sequence stationary source and  be the distribution of the corresponding noisy sequence. Then

Non-asymptotic performance
Let  denote the DUDE on with context length  defined on -blocks. Then there exist explicit constants  and  that depend on  alone, such that for any  and any  we have

 

.

In fact holds with the same constants  as above for any
-block denoiser . The lower bound proof requires that the channel matrix  be square and the pair  satisfies a certain technical condition.

Background
To motivate the particular definition of the DUDE using the Bayes response to a particular vector, we now find the optimal denoiser in the non-universal case, where the unknown sequence  is a realization of a random vector , whose distribution is known.

Consider first the case .

This optimal denoiser can be expressed using the marginal distribution of  alone, as follows.
 

Turning now to arbitrary , the optimal denoiser  (with minimal expected loss) is therefore given by the Bayes response to 

 

The conditional probability vector  is hard to compute.

not available, the DUDE replaces the unknown vector
 with an empirical estimate
obtained along the noisy sequence  itself, namely with
. This leads to the
above definition of the DUDE.

While the convergence arguments behind the optimality properties above are more
subtle, we note that the above, combined with the
Birkhoff Ergodic Theorem, is enough to prove that for a stationary ergodic source, the DUDE with context-length  is asymptotically optimal all -th order sliding window denoisers.

Extensions
The basic DUDE as described here assumes a signal with a one-dimensional index
set over a finite alphabet, a known memoryless
channel and a context length that is fixed in advance. Relaxations of each of these 
assumptions have been considered in turn. Specifically:
 Infinite alphabets
 Channels with memory
 Unknown channel matrix
 Variable context and adaptive choice of context length
 Two-dimensional signals

Applications

Application to image denoising
A DUDE-based framework for grayscale image denoising achieves state-of-the-art denoising for impulse-type noise channels (e.g., "salt and pepper" or "M-ary symmetric" noise), and good performance on the Gaussian channel (comparable to the Non-local means image denoising scheme on this channel). A different DUDE variant applicable to grayscale images is presented in.

Application to channel decoding of uncompressed sources
The DUDE has led to universal algorithms for channel decoding of uncompressed sources.

References

Noise reduction